Łukasz Sapela (born 21 September 1982) is a Polish former football goalkeeper who is currently a goalkeeping coach for Resovia.

Career

Club
In May 2012 Sapela was listed on a list of players facing match fixing chargers whilst playing for GKS Bełchatów in the 2003/04 season.

In June 2012, Sapela left GKS Bełchatów after 12 years with the club. In July 2012, Sapela signed a one-year contract with Ravan Baku.

In July 2014, Sapela signed a one-year contract with I liga side Olimpia Grudziądz, with the option of a second if they are promoted to the Ekstraklasa.

In July 2015, Sapela joined I liga side Zawisza Bydgoszcz on a one-year deal.

Career statistics

References

External links
 
 

1982 births
Living people
Sportspeople from Piotrków Trybunalski
Polish footballers
Ekstraklasa players
I liga players
II liga players
GKS Bełchatów players
Ravan Baku FC players
Zawisza Bydgoszcz players
Flota Świnoujście players
Miedź Legnica players
Olimpia Grudziądz players
Association football goalkeepers
Polish expatriate footballers
Expatriate footballers in Azerbaijan
Polish expatriate sportspeople in Azerbaijan
Azerbaijan Premier League players